Xylophanes crotonis is a moth of the family Sphingidae first described by Francis Walker in 1870.

Distribution 
It is found in Guatemala, Colombia, Venezuela and south to Bolivia.

Description 
They are without eyespots in the second instar.

Biology 
Adults are on wing year round in Costa Rica.

The larvae feed on Psychotria correae, Palicourea padifolia, Palicourea salicifolia, Coussarea austin-smithii, Coussarea caroliana and probably other Rubiaceae species. They have also been recorded on Rottboellia cochinchinensis.

References

External links
Xylophanes crotonis Sphingidae of the Americas

crotonis
Moths described in 1856
Moths of South America